Joseph J. "Joe" Knilans (born March 20, 1964) is an American government administrator and former politician.  A Republican, he most recently served as an appointee of U.S. President Donald Trump at the Small Business Administration.  He previously served one term in the Wisconsin State Assembly and worked as an appointee of Governor Scott Walker at the Office of Business Development in the Wisconsin Department of Administration.

Biography

Born in Janesville, Wisconsin, he graduated from the University of Wisconsin–Whitewater. He was elected to the Wisconsin State Assembly in 2010. In November 2012, the Democratic candidate Debra Kolste defeated Knilans.

Notes

Politicians from Janesville, Wisconsin
University of Wisconsin–Whitewater alumni
1964 births
Living people
21st-century American politicians
Republican Party members of the Wisconsin State Assembly